The Kitchen Tape is a demo tape by the American rock band Weezer. It was recorded on August 1, 1992, prior to the band's signing with Geffen Records. Although the band had recorded some demos before, these were the band's most serious attempt at the time. According to Karl Koch, the band's webmaster and historian, the purpose of the tape was "...to get shows and also try to make an impression. There were no aspirations yet to try to generate real label interest, but the concept of 'creating a buzz' was being thrown around."

The demos were recorded using frontman Rivers Cuomo's 8-track tape recorder, in a rented garage next to the "Amherst House", where Weezer rehearsed at that time.  The name of the tape comes from the fact that the drums were recorded in a kitchen, where the band members felt that they sounded the best.

Bootlegs of this demo have surfaced. However, they only feature five of the eight songs.  One of the songs that doesn't appear on the bootleg, "Undone - The Sweater Song", along with one that does, "Only in Dreams", was released officially on the Blue Album Deluxe Edition Bonus Disc, Dusty Gems and Raw Nuggets. The Kitchen Tape version of "Say It Ain't So" and "The World Has Turned and Left Me Here" have not officially released but were circulated among fans in 2016 when a fan community paid for a copy of the cassette being sold online.

Songs
Of the eight songs on the demo, five of them were re-recorded for the band's debut album, Weezer (The Blue Album). In 2004, Weezer was re-released in a deluxe edition, which included the versions of "Undone", "Paperface" and "Only in Dreams" from this demo as bonus tracks. "Thief, You've Taken All That Was Me" and "Let's Sew our Pants Together" have not been officially released.

Track listing
 "Thief, You've Taken All That Was Me"
 "My Name Is Jonas"
 "Let's Sew our Pants Together"
 "Undone"
 "Paperface"
 "Say It Ain't So"
 "Only in Dreams"
 "The World Has Turned"

I.  Later re-recorded for the band's debut album.
II.  Demo released on the deluxe edition of the band's debut album

Personnel
Rivers Cuomo - vocals, guitar
Matt Sharp - bass, Vocals
Jason Cropper - guitar, Vocals
Patrick Wilson - drums

References

External links
 The Weezer recording history: Page 3 - Information from Karl Koch on early Weezer recordings, including The Kitchen Tapes

Weezer albums
Demo albums